Ullas is a Bengali social drama film directed by Ishwar Chakraborty and produced by Sankar Sarkar. This film was based on three short stories of Mahasweta Devi namely Daur, Mahadu Ekti Rupkatha and Anno Aranya. This movie was released on 29 June 2012 in the banner of R.N.R. Enterprise. Writer Mahasweta Devi acted herself in the film in the role of Basuli goddess.

Plot
Kanna, a young tribal boy appears for the police constable examination at the time of summer and drops dead at the examination venue. Suddenly he comes alive on his journey to the morgue and starts running. The second story revolves with the struggle of Mahadu, a Korku tribe boy of Maharashtra. He grows to enormous size up to the mark, hunger and energy and destroys all the buildings around Mumbai that were built on the forest land, which is his native place. Anna is the protagonist of the third story. She is a girl of Lodha tribe of Medinipur, West Bengal. A rich wood merchant's son sexually exploits her and she becomes pregnant. Anna takes her revenges.

Cast
 Soumitra Chatterjee as Dr. Mathai
 Tapas Paul as Annada Goldar
 Satabdi Roy as Sumitra
 Shankar Chakraborty as Mr.Kambli
 Biplab Chatterjee as Dikpal
 Mahasweta Devi as Basuli Goddess
 Sadhana Hazra as Anna
 Dolly Basu as Dipkal's wife
 Amit Das as Kanna
 Shanta Sarkar
 Sandhya Sarkar

External links

References

2012 films
2012 drama films
Indian drama films
Films based on short fiction
Bengali-language Indian films
2010s Bengali-language films
Films based on works by Mahasweta Devi